The Faculty of Modern Languages was one of fourteen faculties at the University of Tübingen. It was dissolved in 2010 in the course of the administrative reform, where the number of faculties was reduced from fourteen to seven. The faculty merged with the former Faculty of Philosophy and History and the former Faculty of Cultural Anthropology into the new Faculty of Humanities. 

The Faculty of Modern Languages was the largest faculty of the university with about 8,000 students. It was located in the Neuphilologikum in the Wilhelmstraße area of the town. Most staff and students referred to both faculty and building by the building's unofficial name, Brechtbau, named after the German author and playwright Bertolt Brecht.

The building has its own lecture theatres for use by the faculty's departments as well as being equipped with a significant library containing over 300,000 volumes. Computer pools and wireless internet access allow students to conduct research online.

Departments
The Faculty of Modern Languages consisted of the following schools and departments:

German language and literature
Linguistics (Linguistik)
Neuere deutsche Literatur (16th century till today)
Medievalism
Comparative literature
Scandinavian studies
Media studies (Medienwissenschaft)
English language and literature
American studies
Romance languages and literatures
Slavic languages and literatures
General Rhetoric
Linguistics (Sprachwissenschaft)
General linguistics / computer linguistics
General and theoretical linguistics
Theoretical computer linguistics

Further reading 
 Manfred Muckenhaupt: “Nicht nur über Medien reden. Zur Konzeption des Aufbaustudiengangs ‘Medienwissenschaft - Medienpraxis’ an der Neuphilologischen Fakultät der Universität Tübingen”. In: Wissenschaft und Berufspraxis. Ed.: Georg Jäger and Jörg Schönert. Paderborn: Schöningh, 1997.  (p. 249–267)

See also
Heidelberg University Faculty of Modern Languages

References

External links
Universität Tübingen: Neuphilologische Fakultät (official website) 

University of Tübingen
Language education in Germany
Language education organizations